University College Lillebaelt (Danish: UCL Erhvervsakademi og Professionshøjskole) is one of the eight regional organizations of different study sites in Denmark offering Bachelor courses of all kinds in the southwest part of Denmark (Funen and Jutland).

UCL Erhvervsakademi og Professionshøjskole is the second-largest university college as known as university of applied sciences in Denmark. The organization was formed in 2008 by merging CVU Fyn, CVU Jelling, CVSU Fyn, and the Social College of Odense. The college is named after Little Belt, which is the strait between the Danish island Funen and the Jutland Peninsula.

In total there are 10,000 registered students and 1,000 employees. Turnover is 475 million DKK annually.

Campuses

University College Lillebaelt has five campuses in different locations of the Southern Denmark Region. Currently, it has branches in Vejle, Odense, Jelling, Svendborg, and Fredericia. The headquarter is located in Vejle.

Education 

Within 4 different faculties, UCL teaches roughly 40 academy and professional bachelor's programmes.

 Academy Profession programmes (2 years, taught in Danish/English);
 Professional Bachelor's programmes (3–4 years, taught in Danish/English);
 Top Up Bachelor's programmes (1½ years, taught in Danish/English);
 Full degree programmes (taught in English);
 Exchange programmes (taught in English).

Faculties 

 Faculty of Business Science;
 Faculty of Technology and Construction;
 Faculty of Education and Social Sciences;
 Faculty of Health Sciences.

Professional Programmes

 Occupational Therapist (Bachelor of Occupational Therapy) - (Odense);
 Physiotherapist (Bachelor of Physiotherapy) - (Odense);
 Teacher - (Bachelor of Education) - (Odense and Jelling);
 Pedagogue (Bachelor in Social Education) - (Odense, Jelling, Svendborg and Vejle);
 Therapist (Bachelor of Therapy) - (Odense and Jelling);
 Radiographer (Bachelor of Radiography) - (Odense);
 Social worker (Bachelor of Social Work) - (Odense); 
 Nurse (Bachelor of Science in Nursing) - (Odense, Svendborg and Vejle).

UCL moving schedule 2018 

It was announced on University College Lillebaelt website in May 2008, that through negotiating with University of Southern Denmark, UCL had agreed with the university that UCL could take over the buildings at Niels Bohrs Allé in Odense, where the university currently has its Faculty of Engineering (formerly Odense University College of Engineering) in 2016. According to UCL the purpose of this relocation is to establish a comprehensive multi-disciplinary campus with a good study environment for UCL students who wish to be educated as occupational therapists, physiotherapists, teachers, pedagogues, radiographers and nurses. The only study program which will not be moved from its original address is the bachelor program of Social Work which will remain at its current address on the former The School of Social Work in Odense (Now - The School of Social Work, Odense - University College, Little Belt) on Tolderlundsvej in the city center of Odense. On 1 August 2018 the Business Academy Lillebaelt and University College Lillebaelt were merged and are now known as UCL University College.

References

External links 
 Homepage of University College Lillebaelt

Colleges in Denmark
Universities in Denmark